Bartosz Ryszard Fabiński (born 26 April 1986) is a Polish mixed martial artist who fights in the Middleweight division. He has formerly competed in  the Ultimate Fighting Championship (UFC).

Background
Fabiński was born in Warsaw, Poland. He began training in judo when he was seven years old. He took an interest in fighting in 2010 after joining the Nastula Team, the MMA gym of former Olympic gold medalist Paweł Nastula.

Mixed martial arts career
Fabiński made his MMA debut in November 2011 and by 2014 had compiled a record of 11–2 fighting all but one of his fights in Poland, winning the PLMMA Middleweight Champion and Oktagon MMA 4-Man Middleweight Tournament Champion.

Ultimate Fighting Championship
Fabiński made his promotional debut against Garreth McLellan at UFC Fight Night 64, replacing Krzysztof Jotko who had suffered a broken arm. He won the bout via unanimous decision.

Fabiński was then scheduled to face Hector Urbina at The Ultimate Fighter Latin America 2 Finale. He won the bout via unanimous decision.

Fabiński was expected to face Nicolas Dalby at UFC Fight Night 86, but was removed from the card for undisclosed reasons.

After  years away due to injury, Fabiński was then scheduled to return against Emil Weber Meek at UFC Fight Night 134.  Despite getting rocked in the third round, he won the bout via unanimous decision.

Fabiński faced Michel Prazeres at UFC Fight Night 140. He lost the fight via a guillotine choke in the first round.

Fabiński was expected to face promotional newcomer Sergey Khandozhko on June 1, 2019, at UFC Fight Night: Gustafsson vs. Smith, but pulled out due to injury.

Fabiński was scheduled to face Shavkat Rakhmonov on March 21, 2020, at UFC Fight Night: Woodley vs. Edwards. Due to COVID-19 pandemic the bout was moved to Cage Warriors 113 and he was scheduled to face Darren Stewart instead. Fabiński won the fight via unanimous decision.

Fabiński faced André Muniz on September 5, 2020, at UFC Fight Night 176. He lost the fight via an armbar in round one.

Fabiński faced Gerald Meerschaert on April 17, 2021, at UFC on ESPN 22. He lost the fight via technical submission in round one.

After the loss he was released by UFC. Fabiński holds the all-time UFC record for Control Time Percentage with 79.1%.

Mixed martial arts record

|-
|Loss
|align=center|15–5
|Gerald Meerschaert
|Technical Submission (guillotine choke)
|UFC on ESPN: Whittaker vs. Gastelum
|
|align=center|1
|align=center|2:00
|Las Vegas, Nevada, United States
|
|-
|Loss
|align=center|15–4
|André Muniz
|Submission (armbar)
|UFC Fight Night: Overeem vs. Sakai
|
|align=center|1
|align=center|2:42
|Las Vegas, Nevada, United States
|
|-
|Win
|align=center|15–3
|Darren Stewart
|Decision (unanimous) 
|Cage Warriors 113
|
|align=center|3
|align=center|5:00
|Manchester, England
|
|-
|Loss
|align=center|14–3
|Michel Prazeres
|Submission (guillotine choke)
|UFC Fight Night: Magny vs. Ponzinibbio 
|
|align=center|1
|align=center|1:02
|Buenos Aires, Argentina
|
|-
|Win
|align=center|14–2
|Emil Weber Meek
|Decision (unanimous)
|UFC Fight Night: Shogun vs. Smith 
|
|align=center| 3
|align=center| 5:00
|Hamburg, Germany
|
|-
|Win
|align=center|13–2
|Héctor Urbina
|Decision (unanimous)
|UFC Fight Night: Magny vs. Gastelum 
|
|align=center| 3
|align=center| 5:00
|Monterrey, Mexico
|
|-
|Win
|align=center|12–2
|Garreth McLellan
|Decision (unanimous)
|UFC Fight Night: Gonzaga vs. Cro Cop 2 
|
|align=center| 3
|align=center| 5:00
|Kraków, Poland
|
|-
|Win
|align=center|11–2
|Alik Tseiko
|Decision (split)
|MMA Raju 14 
|
|align=center| 3
|align=center| 5:00
|Tartu, Estonia
|
|-
|Win
|align=center|10–2
|Alexey Repalov
|TKO (doctor stoppage)
|Fighters Arena 9 
|
|align=center| 1
|align=center| 1:54
|Józefów, Poland
|
|-
|Win
|align=center|9–2
|Gregor Herb
|Decision (unanimous)
|WAM: Fabiński vs. Herb 
|
|align=center| 3
|align=center| 5:00
|Warsaw, Poland
|
|-
|Win
|align=center|8–2
|Michał Szuliński
|TKO (elbows)
|PLMMA 29: Extra 
|
|align=center| 1
|align=center| 4:10
|Legionowo, Poland
|
|-
|Loss
|align=center|7–2
|Wendres Carlos da Silva
|Decision (unanimous)
|Pro MMA Challenge 1: Drwal vs. Heleno 
|
|align=center| 3
|align=center| 5:00
|Wrocław, Poland
|
|-
|Win
|align=center|7–1
|Antoni Chmielewski
|TKO (doctor stoppage)
|PLMMA 26 Extra: Legionowo 
|
|align=center| 1
|align=center| 5:00
|Legionowo, Poland
|
|-
|Win
|align=center|6–1
|Dominik Chmiel
|TKO (punches)
|Gladiator World Fight 2
|
|align=center| 1
|align=center| 0:00
|Brodnica, Poland
|
|-
|Win
|align=center|5–1
|Adam Kowalski
|TKO (punches)
|BOC (PL): Battle of Champions 
|
|align=center| 1
|align=center| 4:21
|Zamość, Poland
|
|-
|Loss
|align=center|4–1
|Marcin Bandel
|Submission (heel hook)
|FA 4: Chlewicki vs. Nobrega 
|
|align=center| 1
|align=center| 1:10
|Włocławek, Poland
|
|-
|Win
|align=center|4–0
|Adam Biega
|TKO (corner stoppage)
|Oktagon MMA 1 
|
|align=center| 1
|align=center| 1:57
|Sanok, Poland
|
|-
|Win
|align=center|3–0
|Bartlomiej Butryn
|TKO (punches)
|Oktagon MMA 1 
|
|align=center| 1
|align=center| 2:18
|Sanok, Poland
|
|-
|Win
|align=center|2–0
|Marcin Mateusz Kurylczyk
|Decision (unanimous)
|SFT: MMA Fight Night Diva SPA
|
|align=center|2
|align=center|5:00
|Kołobrzeg, Poland
|
|-
|Win
|align=center| 1–0
|Robert Białoszewski
|TKO (punches)
|FC: Battle of Warsaw
|
|align=center|1
|align=center|0:20
|Warsaw, Poland
|
|}

References

External links
 
 

1986 births
Living people
Polish male mixed martial artists
Middleweight mixed martial artists
Welterweight mixed martial artists
Mixed martial artists utilizing judo
Sportspeople from Warsaw
Polish male judoka
Ultimate Fighting Championship male fighters